is a 2022 online first-person team shooter developed by Bandai Namco Online and published by Bandai Namco Entertainment. The game's production was revealed on July 15, 2021, when they began seeking applications for closed beta testing. Further plans for console releases were announced on March 10, 2022. It was announced to start official service on Windows on September 21, 2022, and later released on PlayStation 4, PlayStation 5, Xbox One, and Xbox Series X/S on November 30, without cross-play support.

Gameplay 
Gundam Evolution is a team-based shooter, where two opposing squads, with six players each, combat one another as they seek to perform opposing objectives on the map. These objectives vary depending on the game mode. Modes include Point Capture, where players must attempt to attack and capture points on the map from the defending team, Domination, which has both teams attempt to capture three points on the map, and Destruction, which has teams trying to activate or stop a weapon of mass destruction that the other team is trying to use against them.

Units

Default units
Pale Rider
Gundam
Zaku II (Ranged)
Gundam Barbatos
Sazabi
Methuss
GM Sniper II
Asshimar
DOM Trooper
Turn A Gundam
Guntank
GM

Unlockable units
Marasai (UC)
Gundam Exia
Mahiroo
Zaku II (Melee)
Unicorn Gundam
Nu Gundam
Hyperion Gundam
Gundam Heavyarms Custom [EW]

References

External links 
 

2022 video games
First-person shooters
Bandai Namco games
Gundam video games
Multiplayer video games
Video games developed in Japan
PlayStation 4 games
PlayStation 5 games
Xbox One games
Xbox Series X and Series S games
Windows games
Unreal Engine games